Menidiinae is a subfamily of the Neotropical silversides, part of the family Atherinopsidae. This subfamily is made up of two tribes, seven genera and around 80 species. They are primarily a tropical subfamily but there are some temperate species, this subfamily is found in both the Atlantic and Pacific Oceans.

Tribes and genera
 Tribe Mendiniini
 Genus Chirostoma Swainson, 1839
 Genus Labidesthes Cope, 1870
 Genus Menidia Bonaparte, 1836
 Genus Poblana de Buen, 1945
 Tribe Membranini
 Genus Atherinella Steindachner, 1875
 Genus Melanorhinus Metzelaar, 1919
 Genus Membras Bonaparte, 1836

References

Atherinopsidae